ATM Alamgir (1950 – 3 August 2020) was a Bangladeshi Jatiya Party (Ershad) politician and a Jatiya Sangsad member representing  the Comilla-10 constituency as a Bangladesh Nationalist Party member.

Career
Alamgir was elected to parliament from Comilla-10 as a Bangladesh Nationalist Party candidate in 1991. He left the Bangladesh Nationalist Party and joined the Jatiya Party (Ershad) on 23 April 2016.

Death 
Alamgir died from COVID-19 at Greenlife Medical College Hospital in Dhaka on 3 August 2020, during the COVID-19 pandemic in Bangladesh.

References

1950 births
2020 deaths
University of Dhaka alumni
20th-century Bangladeshi lawyers
Jatiya Party politicians
Bangladesh Nationalist Party politicians
5th Jatiya Sangsad members
6th Jatiya Sangsad members
Deaths from the COVID-19 pandemic in Bangladesh
Comilla Victoria Government College alumni